South Western Subregion is a subregion in the central Maekel region (Zoba Maekel) of Eritrea.

References

Subregions of Eritrea

Central Region (Eritrea)
Subregions of Eritrea